Grov or Grovfjord is a village in Tjeldsund Municipality in Troms og Finnmark county, Norway. The Moelva and Gårdselva rivers flow through the village into the fjord.

Grov is the location of the local primary and secondary schools, Astafjord Church, and a library.  There are some local industries that mostly center on agriculture, fish farming, and boat building.  Grov was the municipal center of the former municipality of Astafjord.

References

Villages in Troms
Skånland